The second HMS Whirlwind  was a W-class destroyer of the British Royal Navy and was built by Hawthorn Leslie and was launched on 30 August 1943. She saw service during World War II and the Cold War.

Design and construction
Whirlwind was one of eight W-class destroyers ordered as the 9th Emergency Flotilla on 3 December 1941. The W-class were War Emergency Programme destroyers, intended for general duties, including use as anti-submarine escort, and were to be suitable for mass-production. They were based on the hull and machinery of the pre-war J-class destroyers, but with a lighter armament (effectively whatever armament was available) in order to speed production. The W-class were almost identical to the U-class ordered as the 7th Emergency Flotilla and the V-class ordered as the 8th Emergency Flotilla earlier in the year, with the major difference the fitting of a new dual-purpose fire control director, capable of directing both anti-aircraft and anti-aircraft fire.

Whirlwind was laid down at Hawthorn Leslie's Hebburn, Tyneside shipyard on 31 July 1942, was launched on 30 August 1943 and was completed on 20 July 1944.

Displacement was  standard and  full load.

The ship had a main gun armament of four 4.7 inch (120 mm) QF Mk. IX guns, capable of elevating to an angle of 55 degrees, giving a degree of anti-aircraft capability. The close-in anti-aircraft armament for the class was one Hazemayer stabilised twin mount for the Bofors 40 mm gun and four twin Oerlikon 20 mm cannons. Two quadruple mounts for 21 inch (533 mm) torpedoes were fitted, while the ship had an depth charge outfit of four depth charge mortars and two racks, with a total of 70 charges carried.

Whirlwind was fitted with a Type 276 surface warning radar on the ship's lattice foremast, together with a high-frequency direction finding (HF/DF) aerial, with a Type 291 air warning radar on a pole mast aft. A Type 285 fire control radar integrated with the ship's high-angle gun director, while the Hazemayer mount had an integrated Type 282 radar. Whirlwind had a crew of 179 officers and other ranks.

Royal Navy service
On commissioning, when the ship was assigned the pennant number R87, Whirlwind was allocated to serve with the Eastern Fleet, and left Britain in October 1944. While on passage, she was briefly diverted to operations in the Mediterranean, escorting the battleship  during a bombardment of the island of Milos in the Aegean on 13 November 1944, before continuing to the Eastern Fleet's base at Trincomalee in Ceylon (now Sri Lanka). On 16 January 1945, the British Pacific Fleet, including Whirlwind, left Trincomalee for the Pacific. The task force's carriers launched two raids against oil refineries in Sumatra, Operation Meridian on 24 January and 29 January before completing passage to the Pacific when the Fleet reached Fremantle in Australia on 4 February 1945.

Following service in the Second World War, Whirlwind was based at Rosyth in 1947 and 1948 as a boys training ship. Between 1952 and 1953 she was converted into a Type 15 fast anti-submarine frigate by Palmers, with the new pennant number F187.

She recommissioned on 28 July 1953 and was allocated to the 5th Frigate Squadron for service in the Mediterranean.  In 1954 she participated in the recovery of the wreckage of the crashed de Havilland Comet off the island of Elba. In 1956 she was part of the Royal Navy force deployed to the Eastern Mediterranean as part of the Suez Crisis.  At this time she was part of the 5th Frigate Squadron. She also undertook patrols off the Cyprus coast.  Between June 1959 and May 1961 she underwent a refit at Rosyth.

In 1961 Whirlwind recommissioned to the 8th Frigate Squadron for service at Home and in the West Indies. In December 1962 Whirlwind was at Bermuda during the talks between British Prime Minister Harold Macmillan and American President John F. Kennedy that resulted in the Nassau Agreement which allowed Britain to purchase Polaris nuclear-armed missiles. Whirlwinds crew provided security for the meeting while the ship formed a communications link for the Ministry of Defence.

Decommissioning and disposal
In 1966 Whirlwind was placed on the disposal list.  On 12 August 1969 she was towed from Portsmouth to Pembroke Dock for use as a target. She foundered at her moorings in Cardigan Bay on 29 October 1974 while in use as a target.

References

Publications
 
 
 
 
 
 
 
 
 
 
 

 

W and Z-class destroyers
1943 ships
World War II destroyers of the United Kingdom
Cold War destroyers of the United Kingdom
Type 15 frigates of the Royal Navy
Cold War frigates of the United Kingdom
Ships sunk as targets
Maritime incidents in 1974
Shipwrecks of Wales